Dąbrowa Wielka may refer to the following places:
Dąbrowa Wielka, Kuyavian-Pomeranian Voivodeship (north-central Poland)
Dąbrowa Wielka, Łódź Voivodeship (central Poland)
Dąbrowa Wielka, Podlaskie Voivodeship (north-east Poland)